Mix FM may refer to:

Radio stations

Brazil
Mix FM (Brazil), a Brazilian CHR radio network

Latvia
Mix 102.7, Riga

Australia
92.7 Mix FM, Maroochydore, Queensland 
Mix 94.5, Perth, Western Australia
Mix 101.1, a defunct adult contemporary radio station in Melbourne, now KIIS 101.1
Mix 102.3, Adelaide
Mix 104.9, Darwin, Northern Territory
Mix 106.3, Canberra
Mix 106.5, a defunct adult contemporary radio station in Sydney, now KIIS 106.5
Mix FM Townsville (106.3 FM), a defunct radio station in Townsville, now Star 106.3

Armenia
Mix FM (Stepanakert) (105.0), Stepanakert, Karabakh

Canada
Mix FM (Ottawa) (91.9), Ottawa, Ontario
CJPG-FM (Mix 96.5), Portage la Prairie, Manitoba
CILT-FM (Mix 96.7), Steinbach, Manitoba

Cyprus
Mix FM Cyprus (102.3 & 90.8), Limassol

Fiji
 Mix FM (Fiji) (93.8 & 93.6)

Lebanon
Mix FM Lebanon (104.4 & 104.7 FM), Beirut

Malaysia
Mix (Malaysian radio station)

Philippines
DXMX (105.9 Mix FM), Davao City
DYOT (MiX FM Oton), a Manila Broadcasting Company station

United Kingdom
Mix 96 (Aylesbury), Buckinghamshire, England
Mix 107, High Wycombe, Buckinghamshire, England

United States
WHLK (formerly branded Mix 106.5) in Cleveland, Ohio
KAMX (Mix 94.7) in Austin, Texas
KMGE (formerly Magic 94.5, now Mix FM 94.5) in Eugene, Oregon
KHIX (Mix 96.7) in Carlin, Nevada
KDMX (Mix 102.9) in Dallas, Texas
KHMX (Mix 96.5) in Houston, Texas
KMXB (Mix 94.1) in Las Vegas, Nevada
KMXG (Mix 96 in the Quad Cities
KONA-FM (Mix 105.3) in Kennewick, Washington
KMXP (Mix 96.9) in Phoenix, Arizona
KMXZ-FM (Mix 94.9) in Tucson, Arizona
KRAV-FM (Mix 96) in Tulsa, Oklahoma
KXXM (Mix 96.1) in San Antonio, Texas
KYMX (Mix 96) in Sacramento, California
WBVI (Mix 96.7) in Findlay, Ohio
WWBX (Mix 104.1) in Boston, Massachusetts
WEIU (FM) (Hit Mix 88.9) in Charleston, Illinois
WFMX (Mix 107.9) in Skowhegan, Maine
WFTN-FM (Mix 94.1) in Franklin, New Hampshire
WKJX (Mix 96) in Elizabeth City, North Carolina
WWKL (FM) (formerly branded Mix 106.7) in Camp Hill, Pennsylvania
WMXA (Mix 96.7) in Auburn, Alabama
WMXD (Mix 92.3) in Detroit, Michigan
WMXW (Mix 103.3) in Binghamton, New York
WXYM (Mix 96.1) in Tomah, Wisconsin
Mix (XM), XM satellite radio channel
WMGI (100.7 MIX FM) in Terre Haute, Indiana                           
WMNP (99.3 FM MIXX 993) in Newport, Rhode Island
WWMX (Mix 106.5) in Baltimore, Maryland

See also 
 Mixx FM (disambiguation)